Govind Ram Meghwal (born 20 January 1962) is an Indian politician from Indian National Congress. He is a Cabinet Minister for Disaster Management & Relief, Administrative Reforms and Coordination, Statistic Policy Planning Department in Government of Rajasthan and a Member of Rajasthan Legislative Assembly from Khajuwala. He got elected as an MLA from Nokha, Bikaner first in 2003 and then again in 2018 from Khajuwala. He has also served as the Parliamentary secretary, State Minister Government of Rajasthan from 2003 to 2008. He was made the Vice President of Rajasthan Pradesh Congress Committee in January 2021.

Personal life 
Govind Ram Meghwal was born to Shri Tikuram in Poogal, Bikaner, a village in Rajasthan, on 20 January 1962. He is married to Smt. Asha. He holds a degree in Master of Arts.

Positions held

References

Further reading 
Rajasthan Legislative Assembly
Rajasthan cabinet reshuffle: CM Ashok Gehlot allots portfolios to ministers, keeps home, finance; check complete list here
Disaster Management, Relief & Civil Defence Department Official Website
सीएम गहलोत ने किया विभागों का बंटवारा, जानें किस मंत्री को कौनसा विभाग मिला | CM ashok gehlot allocates portfolios to ministers
राजस्थान चुनाव रिजल्ट: खाजूवाला सीट पर कांग्रेस जीती

Rajasthani politicians
Indian National Congress politicians
1962 births
Living people
Rajasthan MLAs 2018–2023
Indian National Congress politicians from Rajasthan